Monotaxis  is a genus of emperors found in the Indian and western Pacific Oceans.

Species
There are two recognized species in the genus Monotaxis:
 Monotaxis grandoculis (Forsskål, 1775) (Humpnose big-eye bream)
 Monotaxis heterodon (Bleeker, 1854) (Redfin bream)

References

Lethrinidae